"Summer (The First Time)" is a song by American singer Bobby Goldsboro, recorded for his album of the same name and released as a single in June 1973. It was written by Bobby Goldsboro, Ashley Abram and Timmy Tappan, and produced by Goldsboro and Bob Montgomery.

Background
According to Bobby Goldsboro, the song was loosely based on something that happened to him with someone older, but not as romantic as that depicted in the song. The song was recorded largely as Goldsboro had envisioned apart from the piano riff that started the song and repeated throughout the song as well as the ending descending scale, which were written by his pianist conductor Timmy Tappan. The song was preceded by the sounds of ocean waves and seagulls, taken from a sound effect library. The label had wanted to remove these sounds to shorten the song, but Goldsboro insisted that they be kept.

The song is about someone reminiscing about being a 17-year-old boy in his first romantic experience with a 31-year-old woman during the summer.  Using a repeating piano riff, 12-string guitar, and an orchestral string arrangement (engineered by Ernie Winfrey), the song was suggestive enough to spark some controversy at the time.  The sound of seagulls combined with the string arrangement at the start of the record, which last 57 seconds until the vocals come in, creates the impression of being on a beach in mid-summer.  Whilst Goldsboro' was writing the music he and his band made a television appearance on The Tonight Show.  During this appearance Goldsboro' played part of the song on guitar when musician Tappan first played the piano riff that dominated part of the song.

Chart history
The song was Goldsboro's second UK hit recorded on United Artists Records UP35558 and peaked at number nine in the UK Singles Chart, spending 10 weeks in the UK Top 50 singles chart.  It reached number seven in the Australia, and became a Top 40 Pop and Adult Contemporary hit in both the U.S. and Canada.

Weekly charts

Year-end charts

Cover versions
Although the German song Und Es War Sommer (1976) by Peter Maffay, covers exactly the same subject as Bobby Goldsboro's song, it cannot be considered as a cover, since the melody is clearly different. 

Millie Jackson released a cover of Summer (the first time) as the closing track of her 1974 album Caught Up. It is sung from the females perspective with only a few adjustments made to the lyrics.

References

External links 

 

Songs about nostalgia
1973 singles
Song recordings produced by Bob Montgomery (songwriter)
1973 songs
Bobby Goldsboro songs
United Artists Records singles
Songs about casual sex